The 2003 World Women's Handball Championship, the 16th handball world championship for women, was played in Croatia between 2 and 14 December 2003.

Qualification
The following nations were qualified:

Preliminary round

Group A in Split

Tuesday, 2 December:
  41 - 18 
  32 - 25 
  28 - 25 
Wednesday, 3 December:
  33 - 27 
  12 - 38 
  15 - 33  
Thursday, 4 December:
  27 - 25 
  28 - 24 
  33 - 13 
Saturday, 6 December:
  12 - 36 
  20 - 28  
  44 - 41 
Sunday, 7 December:
  30 - 19 
  28 - 29 
  27 - 25

Group B in Poreč

Tuesday, 2 December:
  28 - 27 
  46 - 16 
  29 - 19 
Wednesday, 3 December:
  31 - 18  
  22 - 26  
  20 - 47  
Thursday, 4 December:
  27 - 21 
  22 - 29  
  38 - 15 
Saturday, 6 December:
  24 - 18 
  26 - 30  
  12 - 41 
Sunday, 7 December:
  31 - 16 
  34 - 39 
  39 - 14

Group C in Karlovac

Tuesday, 2 December:
  30 - 24 
  29 - 30 
  43 - 13 
Wednesday, 3 December:
  28 - 28 
  25 - 27 
  16 - 24 
Thursday, 4 December:
  33 - 15 
  45 - 13 
  41 - 30 
Saturday, 6 December:
  14 - 28 
  19 - 33  
  25 - 23 
Sunday, 7 December:
  30 - 39 
  29 - 21 
  31 - 18

Group D in Čakovec

Tuesday, 2 December:
  43 - 25 
  34 - 26 
  20 - 20 
Wednesday, 3 December:
  28 - 32 
  30 - 27 
  20 - 29 
Thursday, 4 December:
  38 - 25 
  30 - 28 
  24 - 21 
Saturday, 6 December:
  17 - 36 
  34 - 30 
  29 - 21 
Sunday, 7 December:
  31 - 26 
  29 - 28 
  19 - 29

Main Round
Top two teams from each group advanced to the Semifinals. The third placed teams from each group competed in the 5th/6th placement match.

Group I

Tuesday, 9 December:
  27 - 26 
  31 - 27 
  25 - 27 
Wednesday, 10 December:
  25 - 25 
  25 - 28 
  33 - 35 
Thursday, 11 December:
  27 - 38 
  29 - 32 
  20 - 19

Group II in Rijeka

Tuesday, 9 December:
  31 - 30 
  27 - 30 
  26 - 25 
Wednesday, 10 December:
  24 - 24 
  23 - 25 
  30 - 28 
Thursday, 11 December:
  31 - 23 
  29 - 28 
  23 - 35

Final round
In Zagreb

Ranking and Statistics

Final ranking

All Star Team
Goalkeeper: 
Left wing: 
Left back: 
Pivot: 
Centre back: 
Right back: 
Right wing:

Top Goalkeepers

Top goalscorers

Medalists

References

 

W
World Handball Championship tournaments
W
Women's handball in Croatia
World Women's Handball Championship
December 2003 sports events in Europe
Sports competitions in Zagreb
2000s in Zagreb
Sports competitions in Split, Croatia
Sport in Karlovac
Sport in Čakovec
Sport in Rijeka
Sports competitions in Poreč
History of Čakovec
21st century in Split, Croatia